Dafydd ab Hugh (born October 22, 1960) is an American science-fiction author.

On October 22, 1960, Dafydd ab Hugh was born in Los Angeles as David M. Friedman.  An author of science fiction, The Encyclopedia of Science Fiction described ab Hugh as best known for his 1990 novelette, "The Coon Rolled Down and Ruptured His Larinks, A Squeezed Novel by Mr. Skunk", which was published in Asimov's Science Fiction and nominated for a Nebula Award.

Bibliography
The Encyclopedia of Science Fiction lists 15 novels in its ab Hugh bibliography:

Jiana

Arthur War Lord

Star Trek

Deep Space Nine

The Next Generation

Voyager

Doom
 With 
 With 
 With 
 With

References

External links

 
 

1960 births
20th-century novelists
living people
writers from Los Angeles